William J. Heath Antonio (born August 15, 1975) is a Filipino-American former professional basketball player. He last played for the GlobalPort Batang Pier in the Philippine Basketball Association. A good three-point shooter, he was drafted 5th overall by the San Miguel Beermen in 1998. He was then sent to the Pop Cola 800s. He retired in 2007 to become a member of the coaching staff of the Coca-Cola Tigers. After working as an assistant coach for the Tigers, for 3 years, he returned to active play during the 2010 PBA Fiesta Conference.

External links
Profile at pba-online.net

Living people
1975 births
Basketball players from California
Chaminade Silverswords men's basketball players
Filipino men's basketball players
People from San Luis Obispo, California
Shooting guards
Small forwards
San Miguel Beermen players
Pop Cola Panthers players
Powerade Tigers players
NorthPort Batang Pier players
American men's basketball players
San Miguel Beermen draft picks